Beddington Zero Energy Development (BedZED) is an environmentally friendly housing development in Hackbridge, London, England. Designed to create zero carbon emissions, it was the first large scale community to do so.

Background
BedZED was designed by the architect Bill Dunster to be carbon neutral, protecting the environment and supporting a more sustainable lifestyle. The project was led by the Peabody Trust in partnership with Bill Dunster Architects, Ellis & Moore Consulting Engineers, BioRegional, Arup and the cost consultants Gardiner and Theobald. The project was also pioneering by being the first construction project where a local authority sold land at below market value to make sustainable development economically viable.

The project was shortlisted for the Stirling Prize in 2003.

Transport
As part of BedZED's eco friendly low-energy-emission concept, cars are discouraged; the project encourages public transport, cycling and walking, and has limited parking space. There are good rail and bus links in the immediate area. They also have a car-share scheme.

Principles

 
 Zero energy—The project is designed to use only energy from renewable sources generated on site. Tree waste was to fuel the development's cogeneration plant (a downdraft gasifier) to provide district heating and electricity. The gasifier was abandoned because of technical implementation problems.
 High quality – The apartments are finished to a high standard to attract the urban professional.
 Energy efficient – The houses face south to take advantage of solar gain, are triple glazed, and have high thermal insulation.
 Water efficient – Most rain water falling on the site is collected and reused. Appliances are chosen to be water-efficient and use recycled water when possible. A "living machine" system of recycling waste water was installed but did not achieve the required water quality standards.
 Low-impact materials – Building materials were selected from renewable or recycled sources within  of the site, to minimize the energy required for transportation.
 Waste recycling – Refuse-collection facilities are designed to support recycling.
 Transport – The development works in partnership with the United Kingdom's leading car-sharing operator, City Car Club. Residents are encouraged to use this environmentally friendly alternative to car ownership; an on-site selection of vehicles are available for use.
 Encourage eco-friendly transport – Electric and liquefied-petroleum-gas cars have priority over cars that burn petrol and diesel, and electricity is provided in parking spaces for charging electric cars.
 A higher reported quality of life, with a strong sense of community.

Performance
Monitoring conducted in 2003 found that BedZED had achieved these reductions in comparison to UK averages:
 Space-heating requirements were 88% less.
 Hot-water consumption was 57% less.
 The electrical power used, at 3 kilowatt hours per person per day, was 25% less than the UK average; 11% of this was produced by solar panels. The remainder normally would be produced by a combined-heat-and-power plant fuelled by wood chips, but the installation company's financial problems have delayed use of the plant.
 Mains-water consumption has been reduced by 50%, or 67% compared to a power-shower household.
 The residents' car mileage is 65% less.

Problems
A review of the BedZed development in 2010 drew mainly positive conclusions. Residents and neighbours were largely happy. However, a few significant failures were highlighted, for example:
The biomass wood chip boiler (biomass gasifier) was no longer in operation and the backup power source, a gas boiler, was used from 2005 - 2017. The downdraft wood chip gasifier CHP (combined heat and power) had reliability problems due to technical problems and the intermittent schedule of operation (no late-night operation) imposed by the local authority. However, BedZED switched from gas back to a biomass pellet boiler in 2017 which provides heat for the district heating network but not electricity, which is now sourced from the grid on a green tariff. The biomass pellets are now sourced from Spain, not from local wood waste. 
The 'Living Machine' water recycling facility had been unable to clean the water sufficiently. The cost of the facility also made it unviable.
Passive heating from the sunspaces had been insufficient.
Because of its location, the development requires the constant use of cars by residents. This negates its fundamental raison d'être, other than as an interesting experiment.

The results show that the average ecological footprint of a BedZED resident is 4.67 global hectares (2.6 planets), which is 89% of the baseline. This would reduce to 4.32 global hectares (2.4 planets) if the energy was all zero
carbon. However, a keen resident at BedZED (if the CHP was working) could achieve an ecological footprint of
3.0 global hectares (1.7 planets) which is 57% of the average. The target was 1 planet.

Awards
 2001 – Housing Design Award for sustainability, from the Royal Institute of British Architects
 2001 – Evening Standard New Homes Awards – BedZED won the London Lifestyle award. "Ambitious and brave, and a model for future developments"
 2001 – UK Solar Awards, run by Energy 21, for BedZED – "perhaps the most influential of all housing projects this century".
 2002 – World Habitat Awards – BedZED was a finalist.
 2003 – Office of the Deputy Prime Minister Award for sustainable communities – BedZED was short listed with 3 other projects.
 2003 – Stirling Prize – BedZED was short listed
 2003 – RIBA journal sustainability award – the judges said "BedZED goes way beyond the standard environmental checklist by challenging both the way we live and work... Until now, pioneering communities have often been attained at the expense of architectural ambition but at BedZED the architects have been highly innovative."
 2003 – Housing Design Awards – BedZED won a 'Completed Scheme' award.
 2003 – Ashden Awards – for projects building on the experience of BedZED
 2002 – Energy Globe Award – international award recognising BedZED as the foremost example of sustainable energy in building and housing.
 2002 – Building Services Award for innovation.
 2004 – Bremen Awards Special Commendation
 2004 – Civic Trust’s sustainability award
 2005 – Sutton and Cheam Society Design award.

See also
 Energy efficiency in housing
 Passive solar building design
 BioRegional
 Peabody Trust

References

External links

 ZedFactory's BedZED website
 BedZED, écoquartier
 Bioregional BedZED website
 An architect’s sustainable dreams - chinadialogue article about BedZED
 Information about BedZED on Peabody's website

Buildings and structures in the London Borough of Sutton
Low-energy building in the United Kingdom
Buildings and structures completed in 2002
Ecovillages
Housing in England
Mixed-use developments in the United Kingdom
2002 establishments in England
Housing estates in the London Borough of Sutton